Excelsior Casino is a casino located in Aruba as part of the Holiday Inn hotel. It was the first Casino to open on the island.  It originally was known as the King Casino, then become the Grand Holiday Casino before adopting its current name in 2000.  It is known as the casino where Caribbean stud poker was invented. And it is also the only casino in Aruba to offer 3-4-5 times odds on Craps and Double Deck Blackjack.

References

External links
 

Buildings and structures in Noord
Casinos in the Netherlands
Tourist attractions in Aruba